Madras is the former name of Chennai, the capital of Tamil Nadu state in India.

Madras may also refer to:

Additional places 
 Madras Presidency, a former province of British India
 Madras State, a state of India until 1968
 Madras, Georgia, a community in the United States
 Madras, Oregon, a city in the United States
 Kampung Madras, a neighborhood in Medan, Indonesia

Other 
 Madras (beverage), an alcoholic beverage
 Madras (cloth), a type of cotton fabric originating in the state of Tamil Nadu in India
 Madras (costume), the national dress of Saint Lucia, Dominica and the French West Indies
 Madras (film), a 2014 Tamil film
 Madras (soundtrack), to the 2014 film
 Madras College, a secondary school in St. Andrews, Scotland, in the United Kingdom
 Madras sauce, a spicy curry flavour
 Madras System, an education method
 HMIS Madras (J237), a WWII ship of the Royal Indian Navy
 45575 Madras, a British LMS Jubilee Class locomotive

See also
 Madra (disambiguation)
 Madrasa (disambiguation)
 Madrasi (disambiguation)
 Madirasi, a 2012 Malayalam-language film